Nabard may refer to:

 Nabard Metro Station in Tehran, Iran
 Nabard Shahrekord F.C. in Shahrekord, Iran
 National Bank for Agriculture and Rural Development in India